is a Japanese actor.

Career
Born in Shinjuku-ku, Tokyo, Watabe debuted as an actor on television in 1991 with the drama Seishun no mon. He won awards of excellence in the best actor and new face categories at the 19th Japan Academy Prize in 1996 for the film Shizukana seikatsu, Juzo Itami's adaptation of his brother-in-law Kenzaburō Ōe's novel.

Filmography

Movies
Zebraman (2004), Oikawa
Love Exposure (2008), Tetsu Honda
Professor Layton and the Eternal Diva (2009), Jean Descole (voice)
The Flowers of War (2011), Colonel Hasegawa
Masquerade Hotel (2019), Inagaki
Daughter of Lupin the Movie (2021), Takeru Mikumo
Masquerade Night (2021), Inagaki

Television
Mōri Motonari (NHK, 1997), Mōri Okimoto 
Keizoku (1999), Tōru Mayama 
Hōjō Tokimune (NHK, 2001), Hōjō Tokisuke
Rookies (2008), Minoru Yoshida
Gaiji Keisatsu (2008), Kenji Sumimoto
Bitter Blood (2014), Akimura Shimao
Shizumanu Taiyō (Wowow, 2016), Shiro Gyoten
On (2016), Iwao Atsuta
Signal (Fuji TV, 2018)
Daughter of Lupin (Fuji TV, 2019–20), Takeru Mikumo
What Will You Do, Ieyasu? (NHK, 2023), Sekiguchi Ujizumi

Video Games
Professor Layton and the Last Specter (2009) - Jean Descole
Professor Layton and the Miracle Mask (2011) - Jean Descole
Professor Layton and the Azran Legacy (2013) - Desmond Sycamore, Jean Descole

References 

http://www.dramago.com/actor/4960_atsuro-watabe

External links
 
 

Living people
Japanese male actors
1968 births
People from Tokyo